Aragats is a village in the Aparan Municipality of the Aragatsotn Province of Armenia.

References

World Gazetteer: Armenia – World-Gazetteer.com

Populated places in Aragatsotn Province
Yazidi populated places in Armenia